Sex and Love is a 2014 album by Enrique Iglesias

Sex and Love may also refer to:

Sex and love addiction, disputed condition that allegedly leads to the subject's repetition of specific thought or behavior patterns against the previously established intentions of the subject
Sex and Love Addicts Anonymous, a twelve-step program for people recovering from sex addiction and love addiction

See also
Sex (disambiguation)
Love (disambiguation)
Love and Sex (disambiguation)